The men's college basketball program of the University of California, Los Angeles (UCLA) was founded in 1920 and is known competitively as the UCLA Bruins. The Bruins have won 11 NCAA Division I championships, including 10 under coach John Wooden, which gives them  the most of any  school. Many former players advanced to play professionally in the National Basketball Association (NBA). , 101 former UCLA players have played in the NBA.

NBA players
Following are former Bruins who have played at least one game in the NBA.

Statistics updated through end of 2021–22 NBA season

NBA draftees
The following former Bruins were selected in the NBA draft but never played a game in the league.

Updated through the 2022 NBA draft

Notes

References
General

Specific

UCLA Bruins in the NBA
UCLA Bruins men's basketball
Bruins
UCLA Bruins
UCLA Bruins NBA